Mount Palatine is an unincorporated community in LaSalle and Putnam counties in the U.S. state of Illinois. The town once had shops and a small college, but declined when the Illinois Central chose a location far to the East. Today the cemetery is a prairie nature preserve.

See also 
 Judson College, Mount Palatine, Illinois

References 

Unincorporated communities in Putnam County, Illinois
Unincorporated communities in Illinois
Unincorporated communities in LaSalle County, Illinois
Ottawa, IL Micropolitan Statistical Area